Danny Devos (born 20 September 1959), also known as DDV, is a Belgian artist whose work involves body art and performance art and a fascination with true crime.

Since 1979 he has done over 160 performances and made several sculptural installations depicting violence, crime and murder. Since 1987 he has been corresponding with serial killers like Freddy Horion and Michel Bellen in Belgium and John Wayne Gacy in the USA.

In 1981 he founded the artist initiative Club Moral with Anne-Mie van Kerckhoven.

From 1998 until 2004 he was Social Commissioner and chairman of the NICC, the first association of Visual Artists in Belgium, where he was in charge of the Social Statute of the Artist.

In 2005 he moved to Beijing in China to develop and manage Art Farm for colleague artist Wim Delvoye.

From 2005 until recently he performed his piece 'Diggin' for Gordon', inspired by Gordon Matta-Clark, at a secret location and can only be seen by the audience through a webcam.

His most recent works are based on Artificial Intelligence text-to-image renderings that are then used to produce 3D printing or CNC machined relief objects.

Club Moral is also a pioneer noise music band.

Apart from solo sound concerts, he also performs with Bum Collar, an improvisational noise band with Anne-Mie Van Kerckhoven on electronics, Mauro Pawlowski on guitar, and Paul Mennes engineering and browntones.

Solo exhibitions
 In Memory of Ed Gein (Ruimte Morguen) 1987
 Belgium's Most Bizarre Artist (Ruimte Morguen) 1989
 De Moorden in Ruimte Morguen (Ruimte Morguen) 1991
 True Crime Art (Galerie Transit) 1991
 The Red Spider of Katowice (Galeria Potocka, Kraków) 1993
 De Wurger / The Strangler (Galerie Annette De Keyser) 1994
 De Vampier van Muizen 1994
 Daders van Dodingen / Perpetrators of Death (Galerie Annette De Keyser) 1996
 Ons Geluk (with Luc Tuymans) 1997
 Speech Regained (Pranakorn Bar & Gallery) 2000
 Thai Boy Slim (Galerie Annette De Keyser) 2000
 A Study for the Happiest Man Alive (Annie Gentils Gallery) 2012
 Picnic at Hanssenspark (De Bond) 2014
 Lily & Rudy (Annie Gentils Gallery) 2016

Group exhibitions (selection)
 Untitled (Ruimte Z) 1979
 1980 (ICC) 1980
 Van Drang tot Dwang (Club Moral) 1983
 De Dood (K4) 1984
 Automobiënnale (Middelheim) 1985
 Antichambres 1986
 Het Onding Kunst (Stalker) 1988
 Wahrheit und Dichtung (Galerie Maerz) 1989
 Prime Time (w139) 1989
 Woord en Beeld ( MuHKA) 1992
 Wunschmaschinen (WUK/Wolkersdorf) 1993
 Transfer (Gent/Recklinghausen/Charleroi) 1994
 De Rode Poort (SMAK) 1996
 Beeldberichten (KMSKA) 1996
 Alter Ego (Silpakorn University) 1999
 The Divine Comedy (Fort Asperen) 1999
 Pauvre Nous (Factor 44) 2004
 Dear ICC (MuHKA) 2004
 Voorbij Goed & Kwaad (Museum Dr. Guislain) 2006
 The Moss Gathering Tumbleweed Experience (NICC) 2007
 All That is Solid Melts into Air (De Maakbare Mens) (Stadsvisioenen) 2009
 The State of Things (National Art Museum of Beijing) 2010
 Hidden – Conflict (CIAP) 2013
 Crime in Art (Museum of Contemporary Art in Kraków) 2014

References

External links
DDV
Performan
Kunstonline

1959 births
Living people
Belgian artists
Belgian performance artists
Flemish artists
People from Vilvoorde
20th-century Belgian musicians
21st-century Belgian musicians